Urqu Jawira (Aymara urqu male, jawira river, "male river", Hispanicized spellings Orkhojahuira, Orkho Jahuira) is a Bolivian river in the La Paz Department, Aroma Province, Calamarca Municipality.

See also

 Jach'a Quta
List of rivers of Bolivia

References

Rivers of La Paz Department (Bolivia)